The men's K-2 200 metres canoeing event at the 2015 Pan American Games was held between the 12 and 14 of July at the Welland Pan Am Flatwater Centre in Welland.

Schedule
The following is the competition schedule for the event:

All times are Eastern Daylight Time (UTC−4)

Results

Final

References

Canoeing at the 2015 Pan American Games